Brayan Enrique Palmezano Reyes (born 17 September 2000) is a Venezuelan footballer who plays as a forward for Chilean Primera División side Huachipato.

Club career
Palmezano made his senior debut for Zulia in a 2016 Copa Venezuela game against Deportivo Lara in September 2016, 4 days after his 16th birthday. He scored his first goal for the club in a 2–0 cup victory over Estudiantes de Caracas. He scored against another Caracas-based side, Caracas FC, in the league the following season, a first-minute goal in a 3–0 win.

International career
In April 2017, Palmezano was called up to the Venezuela under-20 side for the first time.

Career statistics

Club

Notes

References

External links

2000 births
Living people
Venezuelan footballers
Venezuela under-20 international footballers
Venezuela youth international footballers
Venezuelan expatriate footballers
Association football forwards
Zulia F.C. players
C.D. Huachipato footballers
Venezuelan Primera División players
Chilean Primera División players
Expatriate footballers in Chile
People from Maracaibo
Sportspeople from Maracaibo
21st-century Venezuelan people